= Kogieleum Naidoo =

South African professor and researcher

- Occupations: Researcher, Academic

Academic background
- Education: University of Kwazulu-Natal

Academic work
- Discipline: tuberculosis-HIV research
- Institutions: CAPRISA

Kogieleum Naidoo is a South African scientist, researcher and academic at University of KwaZulu-Natal. Her research work has a focus on the HIV & AIDS infection with focus advancing care for individuals affected by Tuberculosis and AIDS.

== Education ==
Kogieleum Naidoo has a MBChB in Medicine and Surgery.

She obtained her PhD from University of KwaZulu-Natal: Durban, within the period of February, 2012 to 14 April 2016.

== Career ==
Kogieleum Naidoo has worked in various capactites from academic, research, and administrative positions.

=== University of KwaZulu-Natal: Durban ===
- Department of Obstetrics and Gynaecology, Pregnancy Hypertension Research Unit -1994
- Clinical Investigator – Paediatric Transmission of AIDS (Petra) Department of Obstetrics and Gynaecology - 1996 - 2000
- Clinical investigator – South African Intrapartum Nevirapine (SAINT) Study (Department of Obstetrics and Gynaecology) - 1999 - 2000

=== King Edward VIII Hospital: Durban ===
- Medical Intern - 1993 - 1994
- Medical Officer (Department of Paediatrics) - 1995 -1996
- Medical Officer (Department of Medicine, University of KwaZulu-Natal) - 2001

=== Centre for the AIDS Program of Research in South Africa(CAPRISA) ===
- Project Director (START study and CAPRISA AIDS Treatment Programme) - 2005
- Head (Treatment Research Programme) - 2007 - 31/10/2024
- Deputy Director and Head of eThekwini CAPRISA Research Clinic (ECRS) - present

== Publications ==
- Recurrent Subclinical Tuberculosis Among Antiretroviral Therapy–Accessing Participants: Incidence, Clinical Course, and Outcomes
- The epidemiology, transmission, diagnosis, and management of drug-resistant tuberculosis-lessons from the South African experience
- Clinical evaluation of SARS-CoV-2 rapid antigen tests during the Omicron wave in South Africa

== Recognition ==
- Inaugurated as members of the Academy of Science of South Africa (ASSAf)
- She was the recipient of the Outstanding Female Scientist Prize in 2023
- In 2023, she was elected as an African Academy of Sciences Fellow
